Huang v Secretary of State for the Home Department [2007] UKHL 11 is a UK constitutional law case, concerning judicial review.

Judgment
The House of Lords held Huang and Kashmiri’s cases succeeded. The claimants’ rights needed to be read purposively and in context. An appellate authority, faced with questions under ECHR art 8, had to decide itself whether refusal was lawful, and was not a secondary reviewing body exercising deference where irrationality or something else had to be established.
Lord Bingham said the following:

Lord Hoffmann, Baroness Hale, Lord Carswell and Lord Brown agreed.

See also

UK constitutional law
E v Secretary of State for the Home Department (Appeal involving the Immigration Appeal Tribunal (IAT) and new evidence)

References

United Kingdom constitutional case law
Article 8 of the European Convention on Human Rights
United Kingdom administrative case law
2007 in British law
2007 in case law